Worksop Town Football Club is an English football club based in Worksop, Nottinghamshire. They are nicknamed The Tigers and play their home games at Sandy Lane in Worksop.

History

First club
The club claims it was originally founded in 1861, which would make it the fourth oldest association football club in the world. However, there is no contemporary evidence to support this claim. The earliest record of football being played by a town club comes from 1873, when a group of 15 Worksopians took on 15 from the Pestalozzian School in the town. The first recorded use of the Worksop Town name was in 1882, when a team using that name played Eckington on 18 February.

The club joined the Sheffield & District Football League in 1892 and also played in the Sheffield Association League during the late 1890s after an unsuccessful one-year spell in the Midland League.

Worksop re-joined the Midland League in 1900 and became a prominent member of the competition before the First World War. It finished third in the league in 1903 and, in 1908, reached the first round of the FA Cup for the first time, losing 1–9 at Stamford Bridge to Chelsea in front of 18,995 spectators.

After the First World War put a halt to football activity in the town, the game returned in 1919 when Worksop Town and Manton Athletic merged to become Worksop and Manton Athletic, although the Worksop Town name remained in popular usage. The club joined the Midland League and in 1921 won the competition for the first time. The 1920s provided the club with its best spell in the FA Cup, reaching the first round in four out of six seasons from 1921. In 1923, it drew Tottenham Hotspur at White Hart Lane – the Tigers pulled off a shock by holding Spurs to goal-less draw. The Worksop board decided against hosting the replay at Central Avenue, and it was beaten 0–9 in the replay two days after the original tie, again at White Hart Lane. In 1926, it reached the second round for the first time after beating Coventry City at Central Avenue in the first round – eventually losing by one goal to three to Chesterfield in the next round.

In 1930, the club withdrew from the Midland League and disbanded, with a new club being formed a week later.

Current club
The new club initially had to play in the Sheffield Association League and Central Combination before joining the Yorkshire League in 1935.

After the end of the Second World War, the club again folded and a new club called Worksop Town Athletic was formed, initially competing in the Sheffield Association League, but later joining the Midland League. In 1956, it progressed to the third round of the FA Cup for the only time in its history, beating Skegness Town and Bradford City before losing to Swindon Town at the County Ground. Worksop won up its second Midland League title in 1966 before becoming a founder member of the Northern Premier League (NPL) two years later. It returned to the Midland League after just one year, however, as the Tigers finished bottom in the NPL's inaugural season.

Worksop won its third and last Midland League title in 1973 and, a year later, re-joined the NPL, eventually finding its feet at this higher level. In 1978, it once more reached the first round of the FA Cup, losing 1–5 to Barnsley at Oakwell. In 1989, it was relegated to Division 1 of the NPL, and had to move to play in Gainsborough when it was evicted from its Central Avenue home. It spent three years in Gainsborough before returning to the newly built Sandy Lane ground in Worksop in 1992.

The Tigers regained NPL Premier Division status in 1998, by which time Chris Waddle was playing for Worksop, and, in 1999, it finished as runner-up in the NPL, only just missing promotion to the Football Conference. In 2004, it was a founder member of the Conference North, but it only lasted three years in the division before being relegated back to the Northern Premier League. It was around this time that the club fell into financial difficulties and lost ownership of its home ground at Sandy Lane, being forced to rent the grounds of Hucknall Town, Ilkeston Town and Retford United for three years.

In 2011, the club finally returned to Sandy Lane, but this time as tenants of Worksop Parramore, which had bought the ground and allowed the Tigers to play there. The 2013–14 season almost saw Worksop promoted back to the Conference North but it was beaten in the league play-off semi-finals. At the end of the season, the club's owner, Jason Clark, revealed that he would no longer be funding the club, plunging it into a financial crisis, and shortly afterwards the decision was taken to resign from the Northern Premier League and to join the Northern Counties East League (NCEL), entering the NCEL's Premier Division.

The drop to the ninth level of the English football league system also meant a first foray into the FA Vase, having previously competed in the FA Trophy. The club has gained considerable success in another cup competition, the prestigious Sheffield & Hallamshire Senior Cup – as of 2014 it had won the competition eleven times.

Worksop was crowned Northern Counties East League champions on 13 April 2019, after beating Albion Sports 4-0.

On 18 March 2023, the club were crowned Champions of the Northern Premier League Division One East with seven games of the season remaining, the first team in English football to secure promotion in the 2022–23 season.

Current squad

Managers

League and cup history

Grounds
Worksop initially played at two different grounds on Netherton Road before, along with the cricket club, it moved to Bridge Meadow, also known as Newcastle Avenue, in 1891. This had separate cricket and football pitches along with a quarter-mile track. In 1901, it moved across the River Ryton to Central Avenue, staying there until 1988, when it was forced to move to play in Gainsborough. It returned to its home town in 1992 when a new ground was built on Sandy Lane. It lost ownership of Sandy Lane in 2005 and again had to groundshare elsewhere before returning to Sandy Lane in 2011, this time as tenants of Worksop Parramore.

Gallery
A series of pictures taken at the Worksop Town vs. Sheffield Wednesday friendly match in July 2011.

Honours

League
Northern Premier League Premier Division
Runners-up: 1998–99
Northern Premier League Division One
Runners-up: 1997–98
Northern Premier League Division One East
Winners: 2022–23
Midland League
Champions: 1921–22, 1965–66, 1972–73
Runners-up: 1962–63, 1966–67, 1973–74
Sheffield Association League
Champions: 1898–99 (joint), 1947–48, 1948–49
Runners-up: 1899–1900
Northern Counties East League Premier Division
Champions: 2018-19
Runners-up: 2014–15

MITSKILLS- tutor of the month 3x

Cup
Northern Premier League Cup
Runners-up: 1999–2000
Sheffield & Hallamshire Senior Cup
Winners: 1923–24, 1952–53, 1954–55, 1965–66, 1969–70, 1972–73, 1981–82, 1984–85, 1994–95, 1996–97, 2002–03, 2011–12, 2021–22
Runners-up: 1899–1900, 1912–13, 1914–15, 1924–25, 1935–36, 1938–39, 1953–54, 1956–57, 1960–61, 1973–74, 1975–76, 1976–77, 1979–80, 1987–88, 1990–91, 1992–93, 1993–94, 2003–04, 2004–05, 2006–07, 2007–08
Northern Premier League Chairman's Cup
Winners: 2001–02
Northern Premier League President's Cup
Winners: 1985–86, 1995–96

Northern Counties East League League Cup
Winners: 2018-2019

Records
Best FA Cup performance: third round, 1955–56
Best FA Trophy performance: quarter-finals, 2000–01, 2005–06
Best FA Vase performance: fourth round, 2014–15

References

External links

Official website

 
Association football clubs established in 1861
Football clubs in England
National League (English football) clubs
Midland Football League (1889)
Yorkshire Football League
1861 establishments in England
Sheffield & Hallamshire County FA members
Central Combination